Yehuda Bacon (born July 28, 1929 in Ostrava) is an Israeli artist who survived the Holocaust.

Biography
Yehuda Bacon was born into a Hasidic (Orthodox Jewish) family. In the fall of 1942, at the age of 13, Bacon was deported with his family from Ostrava to the Ghetto Theresienstadt, where he shared a room with George Brady. In Theresienstadt he played in the children's opera Brundibár. In December 1943, he was deported to the concentration and extermination camp Auschwitz-Birkenau, where he and other imprisoned children were used to bedazzle the International Committee of the Red Cross in the so-called "family camp". In fact, the "Birkenau Boys" were used for transport work in the entire complex of Auschwitz II-Birkenau.

In June 1944, Bacon saw his father murdered in the gas chambers. At this time, his mother and his sister Hanna were deported to the Stutthof concentration camp, where they died a few weeks before its liberation. On January 18, 1945 Bacon was sent on the camp's death march, which lasted three days and led him through the Mauthausen-Gusen concentration camp to its subcamp Gunskirchen. In March, Bacon was sent on another death march to a subcamp of Mauthausen, Gunskirchen, in the woods. As he reports, there was no food, water or clothing. On May 5, 1945 Bacon was liberated by the US Army. Before the SS guards left the camp, they poisoned the rest of the food. After fleeing to a village, many inmates died from eating too much too suddenly, in amounts their bodies could no longer handle. Bacon and his friend Wolfie Adler (who later became an Israeli rabbi and published a book about his experiences) left the camp. US soldiers brought them to a hospital in the Austrian town Steyr.

After his recovery, Bacon returned to Prague hoping to reunite with his mother and sisters. He lived in an orphanage not far from Prague in Štiřín, which was established by the Czech educator and humanist Přemysl Pitter.  The writer H.G. Adler was also a teacher there. Through Pitter and Adler, he found a way to live after the liberation.

In 1946, Bacon immigrated to Israel with the help of Youth Aliyah. There he studied at  Bezalel Academy of Arts and Design. In 1959, he became a professor of graphic art and drawing at Bezalel.

Yehuda Bacon lives with his wife Leah Bacon in Jerusalem. He has two sons and a daughter by a former marriage to Josephine Bacon.

Art career 

After liberation, Bacon decided to become an artist  to process his experiences and try to describe what he lived through. As a survivor he feels a responsibility to tell his story and to make future generations aware of their responsibility in the present and future. He was among the first survivors of the Shoah to set foot again on German soil.

Bacon's drawings show details and sequences of what he saw in the concentration camps and scenes he drew as a teenager shortly after the liberation. His drawings served as  evidence in trials against Nazi criminals (including the Eichmann trial in Jerusalem and the Frankfurt Auschwitz Trials) and were used in the litigation against Holocaust denier David Irving, who challenges the existence of gas chambers in Auschwitz.

His art is a kind of asynergistic interaction: on the one hand, Bacon processes the experiences of his childhood and youth in the concentration camps, on the other he is searching for a way of understanding through his art. Bacon was early part of interfaith dialogues and Israeli-Palestinian dialogue in the 1950s. His art is shown in several museums and collections around the world, among the Israel Museum and Yad Vashem in Jerusalem, the United States Congress in Washington D.C., in the homes of Theodore Roosevelt, John D. Rockefeller, Martin Buber and Chaim Weizmann as well as in London.

Collections
 Yad Vashem, Jerusalem
 Ghetto Fighters' House Museum, Western Galilee
 Victoria and Albert Museum, London
 British Museum, London
 Imperial War Museum, London
 Magnes Museum, Berkeley
 Museum am Dom, Würzburg

Solo exhibitions
 Nora Gallery, Jerusalem (1954)
 Whippmann Gallery, Johannesburg (1955)
 Princeton University, Princeton (1973)
 Lutheran Education Center, Munich (1978)
 Portland City Hall, Portland, Oregon (1988)
 SOCA Gallery, Auckland (1995)
 Studio Visuri Osmo, Helsinki (1999)
 Spectrum Gallery, Frankfurt (2004)
 Museum am Dom, Würzburg (2008)
 Czech Centre, Prague (2011)

Group exhibitions
 Henny Handler, London (1987) starring Naomi Blake
 St. Paul's Church, Frankfurt (1999) with Dan Richter-Levin
 Art Museum, Tel Aviv (1952) with Isidor Aschheim, Naftali Bezem, Nahum Gutman, Aviva Uri, et al.
 45e Exposition de la Maison des intellectuels, Paris (1962)
 National Museum of Modern Art, Tokyo (1962)
 Pratt Graphic Art Center, New York (1966)
 Art Gallery, São Paulo, (1967) by Mordechai Ardon, Moshe Castel, Jacob Pins, Anna Ticho, Yigael Tumarkin, et al.
 Gallery of Modern Art Rijeka, Ljublijana (1968)
 Musée d'Art Moderne, Paris (1981)
 Imperial War Museum, London (2001)
 The Brooklyn Museum of Art, New York (2003)
 Los Angeles Museum, California 2004
 Ben Uri Gallery, London (2008) - Israel and Art - 60 years through the eyes of Teddy Kolek

See also
Visual arts in Israel

References

External links 
 Yehuda Bacon Webpage
 Yehuda and Leah Bacon Fellowship (German)
 Interview with his daughter, BBC journalist Hanna White
 Interview with Yehuda Bacon, Yad Vashem website
 Yehuda Bacon in the Yad Vashem exhibitions, Jerusalem
 Special Exhibition in Yad Vashem
 Bezalel Academy Jerusalem
 Bacon exhibition in the Museum am Dom Würzburg (German)
 Art and Holocaust
 Yehuda Bacon at Memory of Nation site.

1929 births
Living people
Czech emigrants to Israel
Czech Jews
Israeli people of Czech-Jewish descent
Theresienstadt Ghetto survivors
Auschwitz concentration camp survivors
20th-century Israeli male artists
21st-century Israeli male artists
Israeli illustrators
Jewish Israeli artists
Israeli Ashkenazi Jews
People from Ostrava
Bezalel Academy of Arts and Design alumni
Academic staff of Bezalel Academy of Arts and Design
Czechoslovak emigrants to Mandatory Palestine
Jewish concentration camp survivors
Recipients of Medal of Merit (Czech Republic)